Alexander 'Sandy' John Burns Fulton (1942–2001) was the first person from County Fermanagh to play representative football for Northern Ireland.

Football
Sandy Fulton made his debut in 1957 for Enniskillen Rangers at the age of 13 years and four months, scoring in the local derby against Enniskillen Corinthians. In 1958, Enniskillen Rangers won the Mulhern Cup and Mercer Cup. In the Mulhern Cup final, they defeated Enniskillen Corinthians 3–0 at the Broadmeadow. Three days earlier, Corinthians had become the first team from the Fermanagh and Western to win the Irish Junior Cup.

In 1959, Fulton became the first player from the Fermanagh and Western League to make it to the Irish League when he signed for Coleraine F.C. and made his debut at the age of 15. A year later, he moved to Portadown F.C. and a three-year spell with Ballymena United followed. Fulton then played for Linfield F.C. before returning for a year with Enniskillen Rangers. Fulton returned to the Irish League where he played with Cliftonville F.C. until the end of his senior career. Fulton represented Northern Ireland during the 1960/61 season.

Despite considerable interest from English clubs, he missed out on a trial with Wolverhampton Wanderers due to a boat strike and was deemed too old for Chelsea at the age of 21. Fulton returned to Enniskillen Rangers following his senior career. In 2007, he was selected as part of the Fermanagh & Western FA Team Of The Century.

Honours

 Representative Appearances
 Northern Ireland V Wales, Racecourse Ground, Wrexham - Saturday, 11 February 1961
 Northern Ireland V Scotland, Grosvenor Park, Belfast - Saturday, 29 April 1961
 Northern Ireland V England, Old Trafford, Manchester - Saturday, 13 May 1961
 Northern Ireland V Wales, Castlereagh Park, Newtownards - Saturday, 10 February 1962
 Fermanagh & Western Division One
 1956/57 Champions | Enniskillen Rangers
 1958/59 Champions | Enniskillen Rangers
 Mulhern Cup
 1957 Winners | Enniskillen Rangers
 1958 Winners | Enniskillen Rangers
 1959 Winners | Enniskillen Rangers

Castlebar Ambush 
On Sunday 2 September 1973, Sandy Fulton was one of three RUC police officers shot while on a fishing trip in County Mayo. The fishing party of ten, travelling in two unmarked cars, was ambushed on the road between Westport and Castlebar, near Islandeady. It was reported that eight men, some with sub-machineguns opened fire from both sides of the road. Neither of the two drivers were hit and the party were able to escape the ambush site. Fulton's car was hit six times. The injured men took shelter in a farmhouse and notified the Gardai and emergency services. An ambulance conveyed Fulton to Castlebar hospital, where he was treated for bullet wounds to his left leg and arm. The injured men were transferred to the Erne Hospital, Enniskillen under heavy guard.

The Gardai speculated that the party had been followed across the border and shadowed during their weekend stay. On 5 September, two men, John Fadden and Richard McDonnell, appeared in Castlebar court on charges connected to the ambush.

References

External links
 Obituary
Linfield Football Club Official Website
A Priest, a confession and a conscience - BBC NEWS February 20, 2009
 Time to take stock of the influence we have - Denzil McDaniel, Impartial Reporter - 9 October 2015

People from County Fermanagh
Linfield F.C. players
Coleraine F.C. players
Cliftonville F.C. players
Association footballers from Northern Ireland
NIFL Premiership players
2001 deaths
1942 births
Association footballers not categorized by position